Vladimir Vladimirovich Dolbonosov (born 1 April 1970) is a former Soviet and Russian professional footballer.

Club career
He made his debut in the Soviet Top League in 1991 for FC Dynamo Moscow.

References

1970 births
Footballers from Moscow
Living people
Soviet footballers
Russian footballers
Association football midfielders
FC Dynamo Moscow players
FC Tyumen players
Russian expatriate footballers
Expatriate footballers in Germany
Russian Premier League players
FC Saturn Ramenskoye players